Pedion may refer to:
 Pedion, a triclinic crystal form having a single face
 Pedion (laptop), a make of notebooks